Syria competed in the 2008 Summer Olympics which was held in Beijing, People's Republic of China from August 8 to August 24, 2008. This was the nation's eleventh appearance at the Olympics since its debut in 1948. The Syrian Olympic Committee sent eight athletes who took part in five sports in the games.

Athletics

Men

Women

Shooting

Men

Swimming

Men

Women

Triathlon

Weightlifting

See also
 Syria at the 2008 Summer Paralympics

References

Nations at the 2008 Summer Olympics
2008
Olympics